The French destroyer Casque was one of a dozen s built for the French Navy during the late 1930s. The ship was completed during the Battle of France in mid-1940 only days before the French signed an armistice with the Germans. When the Germans occupied Vichy France after the Allies landed in French North Africa in November 1942 and tried to seize the French fleet intact, the destroyer was one of the ships scuttled to prevent their capture. The  (Royal Italian Navy) attempted to salvage her in 1943, but the effort was abandoned the following year. The ship was refloated in 1948 and scrapped.

Design and description
They were powered by two geared steam turbines, each driving one propeller shaft, using steam provided by four Sural-Penhöet forced-circulation boilers. The crew consisted of 10 officers and 177 enlisted men.

The main armament of the Le Hardi-class ships consisted of six Canon de  Modèle 1932 guns in three twin mounts, one forward and a superfiring pair aft of the superstructure. Their anti-aircraft (AA) armament consisted of one twin mount for Canon de  Modèle 1925 guns on the aft superstructure and two twin Hotchkiss  AA machine gun mounts on the roof of the shell hoists for the forward 130 mm mount. The ships carried one triple and two twin sets of  torpedo tubes; the aft mount could traverse to both sides, but the forward mounts were positioned one on each broadside. A pair of chutes were built into the stern that housed a dozen  depth charges.

Modifications
In late 1941 or early 1942, the twin Hotchkiss machine guns were repositioned on the quarterdeck and a pair of single mounts for  Hotchkiss AA guns were installed in their place in front of the bridge. In addition a pair of single mounts for Browning 13.2-millimeter AA machine guns were added on platforms on the sides of the superfiring turret aft.

Construction and career
Ordered on 4 May 1936, Casque was laid down by Forges et Chantiers de la Méditerranée at their shipyard in La Seyne-sur-Mer on 30 November 1936. She was launched on 2 November 1938 and entered service on 20 June 1940. That day the ship steamed for Oran, French Algeria. After the British attacked French Navy ships in nearby Mers-el-Kébir on 3 July, Casque joined the other destroyers in Oran in leaving that day for a safer port, but she had to return to Oran because she had damaged her propeller while getting underway. After repairs, the ship rendezvoused with her sister  and they reached Toulon on 7 July, at which time she was immediately placed in reserve.

When the Germans attempted to capture the French ships in Toulon intact on 27 November 1942, Casque was scuttled by her crew. The Italians attempted to salvage her, but the effort was abandoned after the ship was damaged during the Allied bombing raid on 29 April 1944; she was finally refloated in 1948 and scrapped.

Notes

References

 

Le Hardi-class destroyers
Naval ships of France captured by Italy during World War II
1938 ships
World War II warships scuttled at Toulon
Maritime incidents in November 1942